Born in Mississippi, Raised Up in Tennessee is a 1973 studio album by American blues musician John Lee Hooker.

Reception
Writing for The Sunday Times, Stewart Lee reviewed a 2014 re-release of this album and the 1972 live release Kabuki Wuki on CD, calling Born in Mississippi, Raised Up in Tennessee a "set marred by massed horns and backing vocalists, but sporting the superb nine minute 'How Many More Years You Gonna Dog Me ‘Round?'".

Track listing
"Born in Mississippi, Raised Up in Tennessee" – 5:55
"How Many More Years You Gonna Dog Me 'Round?" – 5:31
"Going Down" – 8:10
"Younger Stud" – 8:34
"King of the World" – 6:06
"Tell Me You Love Me" – 5:57

Personnel
"Born in Mississippi, Raised Up in Tennessee"
John Lee Hooker – guitar, vocals
George Bohanon – trombone
Oscar Brashear – trumpet
Cliff Coulter – electric melodica, guitar
Robert Hooker – organ
John Klemmer – tenor saxophone
Don Menza – baritone saxophone
Steven Miller – piano
Gino Skaggs – Fender electric bass guitar
Ken Swank – drums
Luther Tucker – guitar
"How Many More Years You Gonna Dog Me 'Round"
John Lee Hooker – guitar, vocals
George Bohanon – trombone
Oscar Brashear – trumpet
Mel Brown – bass guitar
Cliff Coulter – guitar
Robert Hooker – electric piano
John Klemmer – soprano saxophone with wah-wah and echoplex, tenor saxphone
Don Menza – baritone saxophone
Gino Skaggs – Fender electric bass guitar
Ken Swank – drums
Luther Tucker – guitar
"Going Down"
John Lee Hooker – guitar, vocals
Elvin Bishop – slide guitar
Chuck Crimelli – drums
Don "Sugarcane" Harris – violin
Robert Hooker – organ
Steven Miller – electric piano
Van Morrison – guitar, vocals
Mark Naftalin – piano
Gino Skaggs – Fender electric bass guitar
"Younger Stud"
John Lee Hooker – guitar, vocals
Ron Beck – drums
Cliff Coulter – electric piano
Oma Drake – vocals
Robert Hooker – organ
John Kahn – Fender electric bass guitar
Marti McCall – vocals
Ray McCarty – guitar
Mark Naftalin – piano
Luther Tucker – guitar
Michael White – violin
Blinky Williams – vocals
Paul Wood – guitar
"King of the World"
John Lee Hooker – guitar, vocals
Mel Brown – guitar
Cliff Coulter – electric melodica
Oma Drake – vocals
Don "Sugarcane" Harris – violin
Robert Hooker – electric piano
Marti McCall – vocals
Gino Skaggs – Fender electric bass guitar
Ken Swank – drums
Luther Tucker – guitar
Blinky Williams – vocals
"Tell Me You Love Me"
John Lee Hooker – guitar, vocals
Ron Beck – drums
George Bohanon – trombone
Oscar Brashear – trumpet
Cliff Coulter – electric piano
Oma Drake – vocals
John Klemmer – soprano and tenor saxophones
Robert Hooker – organ
Don Menza – baritone saxophone
Marti McCall – vocals
Benny Rowe – slide guitar
Gino Skaggs – Fender electric bass guitar
Luther Tucker – guitar
Blinky Williams – vocals
Technical personnel
Baker Bigsby – mixing at The Village Recorder, Los Angeles, California, United States (March 5–7, 1973)
Gil Fortis – mixing assistance
Ken Hopkins – engineering
Al Kramer – front cover photography
Dominic Lumetta – mixing assistance
Ruby Mazur – design
Phil Melnick – back cover photography
Ed Michel – production
Rick Stanley – engineering assistance

References

External links

1973 albums
ABC Records albums